A Jakállan Intrigue is a 1984 fantasy role-playing game adventure published by Tékumel Games for Empire of the Petal Throne and Swords & Glory.

Contents
A Jakállan Intrigue is an adventure in which player characters act in conjunction with several non-player characters acting as guards, assistants, etc., in the city of Jakalla.

Reception
Frederick Paul Kiesche III reviewed A Jakállan Intrigue in Space Gamer No. 71. Kiesche commented that "Intrigue is an excellent adventure, far superior to much of what is currently on the market.  A fine new product from Tekumel Games, indicating that we have real talent working there!"

References

Fantasy role-playing game adventures
Role-playing game supplements introduced in 1984
Tékumel